Leman Street was a railway station on the main line from Fenchurch Street to Blackwall in east London. It was  down the line from Fenchurch Street, situated on the east side of Leman Street, near Cable Street, in the parish of Whitechapel.

Leman Street was opened by the Great Eastern Railway on 1 June 1877, despite having been completed four years earlier; opening was delayed after safety inspectors requested a number of enhancements and modifications. It was located close to the site of the former Cannon Street Road station which was open between 1842 and 1848 on the same route.

The station was partially rebuilt between 1894 and 1896 in connection with the building of a fourth track from Fenchurch Street to Stepney.

During the First World War, Leman Street was closed in May 1916 as a wartime economy measure but reopened in July 1919.

In 1935 the area was re-signalled with the mechanical semaphore signals being replaced by colour light signalling. The signal box at Leman Street closed on 14 April 1935 with control passing to a new signal box at Fenchurch Street.

After years of decreasing usage, it closed permanently in on 7 July 1941 when operated by the London and North Eastern Railway, along with the neighbouring Shadwell & St. Georges East station.

Much of Leman Street station was demolished in the mid-1950s, but the street-level building and one platform remained. Today, there are no obvious remains of the station as those that did remain were demolished during the construction of the Docklands Light Railway in the late 1980s. Trains on the main line from Fenchurch Street now run directly to Limehouse without stopping.

References

Disused railway stations in the London Borough of Tower Hamlets
Former London and Blackwall Railway stations
Railway stations in Great Britain opened in 1877
Railway stations in Great Britain closed in 1916
Railway stations in Great Britain opened in 1919
Railway stations in Great Britain closed in 1941